Newcastle is a village on the northern coast of the island of Nevis in Saint Kitts and Nevis. It is the capital of Saint James Windward Parish. The village is just to the east of the Nevis airport, and in fact much of the village had to be moved over when the runway of the airport was extended a number of years ago. One building that was demolished was an early (17th century) colonial fortification called the Newcastle Redoubt.

References

ORDNANCE SURVEY, GOVERNMENT OF THE UNITED KINGDOM, 1984, Nevis, with part of St. Christopher (Saint Kitts). Series E803 (D.O.S. 343), Sheet NEVIS, Edition 5 O.S.D. 1984.  Reprinted in 1995, published by the Government of the United Kingdom (Ordnance Survey) for the Government of Saint Christopher (St. Kitts) and Nevis.
HUBBARD, VINCENT K., 2002, Swords, ships, and sugar: a history of Nevis, Premiere Editions, Corvallis, Oregon. 5th Edition.

Populated places in Saint Kitts and Nevis